Bruce Marshall Selya (born May 27, 1934) is a Senior United States circuit judge of the United States Court of Appeals for the First Circuit and former chief judge of the United States Foreign Intelligence Surveillance Court of Review who is known for his distinctive writing style.

Education and career

Born in Providence, Rhode Island to a Jewish family, he attended Nathan Bishop middle school and Classical High School in Providence.

Selya received an Artium Baccalaureus degree from Harvard University in 1955. He received a Bachelor of Laws from Harvard Law School in 1958. He was a law clerk for Judge Edward William Day the Chief Judge of the United States District Court for the District of Rhode Island from 1958 to 1960. He was in private practice of law in Providence from 1960 to 1982. He was a Judge of Probate in Lincoln, Rhode Island from 1965 to 1972.

Federal judicial service

Selya was nominated by President Ronald Reagan on July 27, 1982, to a seat on the United States District Court for the District of Rhode Island vacated by Judge Raymond James Pettine. He was confirmed by the United States Senate on August 18, 1982, and received commission the same day. His service was terminated on November 24, 1986, due to elevation to the First Circuit.

Selya was nominated by President Reagan on September 26, 1986, to the United States Court of Appeals for the First Circuit, to a new seat created by 98 Stat. 333. He was confirmed by the Senate on October 8, 1986, and received commission on October 14, 1986. 

In 1996, Selya hired future Supreme Court Justice nominee Ketanji Brown Jackson to a year-long clerkship with the First Circuit Court of Appeals in Providence.

In 2000, Chief Justice William Rehnquist appointed Selya to the Judicial Panel on Multidistrict Litigation, a position Selya held until 2004. In 2005, Chief Justice John Roberts appointed Selya to the United States Foreign Intelligence Surveillance Court of Review, and in 2008 Selya was appointed by Supreme Court Chief Justice Roberts to the chief judgeship of the Court of Review. As the United States Foreign Intelligence Surveillance Court is not an adversarial court and (with few exceptions) only hears argument from the United States government, the Court of Review solely hears appeals from that court when the government is denied a warrant for wiretap surveillance of suspected terrorists or spies.

Judge Selya assumed senior status at the end of 2006. Then Senator Lincoln Chafee recommended that former Rhode Island Supreme Court Justice Robert Flanders be nominated to replace Selya. President George W. Bush interviewed Flanders, U.S. District Judge William E. Smith, and Rhode Island Supreme Court Justice Paul A. Suttell for the position, before selecting Judge Smith as the nominee. Rhode Island Senator Sheldon Whitehouse asserted that, due to the President's failure to work with Whitehouse and fellow Democratic senator Jack Reed in selecting a consensus candidate, the vacancy left by Selya's departure would not be filled during Bush's tenure. On October 6, 2009, President Barack Obama formally nominated Ojetta Rogeriee Thompson to Selya's seat on the First Circuit. She was confirmed by the Senate in a 98–0 vote on March 17, 2010.

In 2022, Selya's career of 36 years was said to be the longest in the history of the first circuit.

Writing style

As a private practitioner, Selya was often lulled to sleep by the legalese and boilerplate rhetoric in judicial opinions, a matter he has sought to remedy since ascending to the bench: "I made a commitment to myself that I would attempt to prove that sound jurisprudence and interesting prose are not mutually exclusive."  Selya disclaims "lexiphanicism for its own sake."  For Selya, precision is a precondition for his use of a word, and "[i]f it does not fit, I won't submit."

Selya aspires toward readability by using uncommon words in contexts that make the words' meanings clear; and apart from his vocabulary, Selya's prose is notable for its readability and its avoidance of clotted or formulaic legal rhetoric. It is clear that Selya is widely read by his colleagues. Over the years 1998–2000, Selya numbered as the fourth most cited federal judge outside of the Supreme Court, as measured by the number of citations to his opinions from outside of his own circuit.  Occupying the three positions above Selya were Judges Richard Posner, Frank Easterbrook, and Sandra Lynch.

Selya's writing style is not without its critics. Boston attorney Harvey A. Silverglate has written that his opinions are "well known" for their "remarkably judgmental but politically naive language," and that "[i]t is not unusual to see Selya gratuitously criticize, in sarcastic and sometimes grandiloquent fashion, a party or witness. He has earned a reputation for tossing around both his power and trademark one-hundred-dollar words."

Notable opinions

One of Selya's recent opinions, Ungar v. PLO, has been singled out by The Green Bag as a notable example of good judicial writing.  A representative sampling of recent opinions includes Aguilar v. ICE, 510 F.3d 1 (1st Cir. 2007) (immigration law and federal jurisdiction); Havlik v. Johnson & Wales University, 509 F.3d 25 (1st Cir. 2007) (education law); Alexander v. Brigham & Women's Physicians Org., 513 F.3d 37 (1st Cir. 2008) (employee benefits); United States v. Martin, 520 F.3d 87 (1st Cir. 2008) (federal sentencing guidelines); Connectu LLC v. Zuckerberg, 522 F.3d 82 (1st Cir. 2008) (civil procedure); Rio Mar Assocs., LP, SE v. UHS of Puerto Rico, Inc., 522 F.3d 159 (1st Cir. 2008) (tort law); and Morales v. Sociedad Espanola de Auxilio Mutuo y Benificencia, 2008 U.S. App. 2380 (administrative and medical law).

See also 

 List of Jewish American jurists

References

Sources
 

1934 births
20th-century American judges
Harvard Law School alumni
Judges of the United States Court of Appeals for the First Circuit
Judges of the United States District Court for the District of Rhode Island
Living people
Lawyers from Providence, Rhode Island
United States court of appeals judges appointed by Ronald Reagan
United States district court judges appointed by Ronald Reagan
Judges of the United States Foreign Intelligence Surveillance Court of Review